is a Serbian humorous comic book series published only in Serbia. Founded by Marko Todosijević (Mrvax) in 2005, in Belgrade, Serbia, it was largely expanded and shaped in its own direction over the following eight years. From 2006 to 2012 it was supported by the Shlitz Comics group with additional support from the Šumatovčka art school.

Information

 (English: Goffies  /ˈɡuː.fi~es/) is a Serbian humorous comic book series about the crazy and socially depraved characters created by its main author, Marko Todosijević (Mrvax), which ran from 2006 to 2009. After a pause of two years, in 2011, the series was re-launched in cooperation with Vladimir Petković (Vlapet) and later on with Tihomir Kostić (Kovenant).

Publication history
The creation of  started when Todosijević worked on a short comic strip, ('The sounds of Hometown') in 2003. It was a strip-based and short-lived series consisting of two issues. Most of the material was accidentally destroyed, and only a couple of panels still exist in physical form. Scriptwriter Marko Radovanović (Maré) also contributed. During the production of the concept and characters, Todosijević took inspiration from people he knew, as some of the characters were caricatures of actual people.

Jackie Chan's movies and Monty Python's Flying Circus had strong effects on the creation of the series. Additionally, domestic Serbian movies including Balkanski Špijun, Varljivo leto '68, Maratonci trče počasni krug, Kad porastem biću Kengur, and Sedam i po also had an influence.

2006

In 2006, the first characters were created. The first were an albino zombie named Zombiša, a dog-groundhog hybrid named Mrmi, followed by Nindža Nidža, Dule Student, and a jelly belly creature named Zglavko. These five characters are the heart of the series and their personalities and appearances underwent minor changes through the years. The name of the series,  ('Pals') was ironic as the characters had more animosity towards each other than sympathy and friendly intentions.  In the original print of the first issue , there were only five characters. The publication's moderate success and joining Shlitz Comics led to a reprint in 2007, which was filled with new pages and one new character.

2007
He was a more-than-obvious parody of DC Comics' Batman, with a big beer belly and the role of masked avenger and pig farmer. His appearance brought more value to the series, but when the second issue of  appeared the same year, entitled , the series showed improvement, both in drawing style and storytelling. The number of characters expanded, so the stories gained more than fights and pranks. Female characters were also brought in, and the series began to touch on more emotional themes; the clashes and animosity featured in the first issue were still present, but crafted with more taste and moderation.

2008–2009
[[File:Panel of the second issue of Prijatelji (comics).jpg|thumb|left|Vukota Šiljić and Nindža Nidža in an action scene from Osasuna VS Calgary ('Osasuna vs. Calgary') (2009).]]

2008 was a quiet year as Todosijević searched for new ideas. The preparation of the new issue lasted over a year. In March 2009, the third issue, entitled  (Osasuna vs. Calgary') appeared. In this issue, besides Todosijević's work, Bojan Milojević (Asterian) contributed with one panel with Nindža Nidža on the back cover. As there was more than enough prepared material, a couple of months later another issue entitled  was published. It was the best issue so far, with excellent gags and a drastically improved style. It featured 27 pages and artistic contributions from Serbian comic artists Saša Arsenić, Miloš Slavković and Borivoje Grbić.

2011–2012

Two years later, Todosijević decided to begin work on  again, this time with Vladimir Petković. Besides the previous main characters, this special publication brought new characters like Radojka, Stamena and Mitar Tuki Trgovac, and announced a crazy new character named Mačo Mikula. Also, in comparison to older issues, this special had titles for the gags and was published in a bigger format.

First, the character of Mile Betmen was removed due to his looks, as he was a parody of DC Comics' Batman. As the team intended to make  more commercial and interesting to publishers, the character was permanently replaced with Mačo Mikula, who became the main character. At some point, Mile Betmen and Mačo Mikula were supposed to work together, but the idea was quickly dropped. The second character which was reworked was Mrmi; from a lovable scamp, Mrmi became a sexually voracious and aggressively crazed character. The surroundings and plot were also reworked. All of the characters faced real-life situations, social injustice and problems, more connections and interactions, alcohol, women, and other issues in today's society. The new authors also inserted a number of new characters to improve the situations, and the series itself, by making them funnier and more interesting.

The three authors decided to make a second volume, primarily because of the changes and new characters that were introduced. The special issue  ('Family Pack/Extreme Pack (Special issue)')  became a turning point in the series and the bridge to a new publication. It was considered the first issue of volume two.

 2013 
During the summer of 2013, the creators entirely changed the series' concept. New episodes were on the way, and opposite to earlier issues, the new edition of  under the working title  would bring longer and more layered stories, filled with themes of the supernatural, horror, action, martial arts, and more detailed storytelling. In August 2013, an additional member was added to the crew, colorist Momir Marković. Besides a plan for the comic to be published in print, the creators also planned to publish special issues online in color, and in additional languages, such as Italian and English.

Style and approach
While Todosijević's style is similar to the Simpsons and André Franquin, Petković's work features influences from Roberto Raviola, Roberto Diso and Fabio Civitelli. Kostić takes his approach from artists like Eduardo Risso, Kenichi Sonoda, Nicola Mari and early Enrico Marini. Regarding writing, all three of the authors take ideas and inspiration from their own inner sources, making the stories very original and hilarious at the same time.

Setting
The main places characters meet are dark alleys, DJ Sarma's flat, or a tavern called Tri Leša ('Three Corpses') owned by Rista Turista.

Concept
Situations present in the series include the problems of today's world, misfortunes or joys, socially depraved situations, sex, violence, sport, love, hate, alcohol, music, and injustice. Dark and light humor are mixed together and can be seen in one panel at the same time, likewise love, hate or violence. In addition to chaos, there is critique of trashy people and their way of life. Occasional song lyrics mockingly appear from Serbian genres such as turbo folk and folk-pop. Themes dealing with the supernatural, aliens, and ancient myths are also included.

Trivia
Both Todosijević and Petković, have appeared in the short psycho-thriller Sanctuary. Unofficially, in video clip form,  covered the song  from Serbian hardcore/crossover band Sick Mother Fakers with illustrations from the issues.

Characters

Main
 Mačo Mikula "Mikula" – main character (2011–present)
 Zombiša "Zombiša" – main character (2006–present)
 Nindža Nidža "Nidža" – main character (2006–present)
 Dule Student "Dule" – main character (2006–present)
 Mrmi "Mrmi" – main character (2006–present)
 Zglavko "Zglavko" – main character (2006–present)
 Vukota Šiljić "Vukota" – main character (2008–present)
 Vanesa Plavuša "Vanesa" – main character (2008–present)
 Fantastični Dragan "Dragan" – main character (2012–present)
 Gojko Grobar "Gojko" – main character (2012–present)
 Kung fu Romi "Petrit, Muharem, Kismet" – main character (2012–present)

Supporting
 DJ Sarma "Sarma" – supporting character (2007–present)
 Radojica "Radojica" – supporting character (2007–present)
 Čobanica Anđa "Anđa" – supporting character (2008–present)
 Lidija Plavuša "Lidija" – supporting character (2008–present)
 Radojka "Radojka" – supporting character (2011–present)
 Stamena "Stamena" – supporting character (2011–present)
 Ovan Zuba "Zuba" – supporting character (2008–present)
 Milorad Bjelogrlić Kojo "Milorad" – supporting character (2012–present)
 Rista Turista "Rista" – supporting character (2012–present)

Occasional
 Prgavi Džeki "Džeki" – occasional character (2007–present)
 Krmak Groki "Groki" – occasional character (2008–present)

Minor
 Mitar Tuki Trgovac "Mitar" – minor character (2011–present)
 Mečka Silvana "Silvana" – minor character (2012–present)

Villains
 Veverac "Veverac" – villain (2012–present)
 Dr. Sidrigajlo "Sidrigajlo" – villain (2012–present)
 Boško Muha "Bosko" – villain (2012–present)
 Jelisaveta "Jelisaveta" – villain (2012–present)
 Katćuša "Katćuša" – villain' (2012–present)
 Gospodin Ramadani "Ramadani" – villain (2013–present)
 Manga Mandov "Mandov" – villain (2013–present)

Discontinued
 Mile Betmen "Mile" – discontinued character (2007–2012)

Timeline
Timeline of characters' appearances through the years:

Timeline

Released issues (bibliography)

Prijatelji authors
 Marko Todosijević(2003–present)
 Vladimir Petković(2011–present)
 Tihomir Kostić(2012–present)

Staff (Prijatelji creative team )
 Ownership: Prijatelji Comics group
 Series creator: Marko Todosijević
 Series co-creators: Vladimir Petković, Tihomir Kostić
 Artwork: Marko Todosijević, Vladimir Petković, Tihomir Kostić
 Illustrators: Marko Todosijević, Vladimir Petković, Tihomir Kostić
 Scripts, text and concept: Marko Todosijević, Tihomir Kostić, Vladimir Petković
 Character creators: Marko Todosijević, Vladimir Petković, Tihomir Kostić
 Web editors: Vladimir Petković, Marko Todosijević
 Magazine design: Marko TodosijevićAdditional associates Illustrator and cover designer: Mrvax
 Magazine designer, and occasional illustrator: 
 Colorist: Momir MarkovićTech crew Media relations and organization': Vladimir Petković

References

External links
 
 UPPS - Udruženje za promociju i produkciju stripa / Comics publishing and promotion society 
  - Interview with Marko Todosijević
  - Official promotional page

Prijatelji, comics
Articles which contain graphical timelines
Fictional Serbian people
Comics set in Serbia
Serbian comics